The Paseo de San Antonio is a pedestrian paseo in Downtown San Jose, spanning from Plaza de César Chávez in the west to San Jose State University's campus in the east.

History

The paseo was developed in 1988 by the San José Redevelopment Agency, with the pedestrianization of San Antonio Street eastwards from Plaza de César Chávez.

Paseo de San Antonio was laid out to serve as a pedestrian axis through central Downtown. It has since become one of the most-utilized pedestrian spaces in Downtown, as a focal point for dining, events, and theatres.

Location

Paseo de San Antonio is located in central Downtown San Jose. It spans from Plaza de César Chávez in the west to the Swenson Gate entrance to San Jose State University's campus in the east.

While the western portion of the paseo follows the former alignment of San Antonio Street, the paseo turns diagonally towards the southeast past 2nd Street.

The Paseo de San Antonio station, on the VTA light rail, is located where the paseo meets 1st Street.

Landmarks
Hammer Theatre
Fairmont San Jose
Twohy Building

See also
Paseo de San Carlos
Paseo de César Chávez
9th Street Paseo

References

External links

Paseos in San Jose, California
Pedestrian malls in the United States
Downtown San Jose